Thaprek is a Village Development Committee in Nuwakot District in the Bagmati Zone of central Nepal. At the time of the 1991 Nepal census it had a population of 3585 people residing in 632 individual households.

References

External links
UN map of the municipalities of Nuwakot District

Populated places in Nuwakot District